The Men's sprint event of the 2009 UCI Track Cycling World Championships was held on 28 and 29 March 2009.

Results

Qualifying (200 m time trial)

1/16 finals

1/8 finals

1/8 finals repechage

Quarter finals

Semi finals

Race for 5th-8th places

Finals

Final classification

References

Men's sprint
UCI Track Cycling World Championships – Men's sprint